Len Holland (28 March 1923 – 13 July 1989) was an Australian rules footballer who played with South Melbourne in the Victorian Football League (VFL).

Family
The son of Leslie Charles Holland (1893-1986), and Mary Holland (1885-1953), née Brett, Leonard Holland was born at Heidelberg, Victoria on 28 March 1923.

He married Geraldine Carmody.

Military service
Having enlisted at the age of 19 with his parents' permission, he served overseas with the RAAF as a radio mechanic during World War II.

Death
He died at the Repatriation General Hospital Heidelberg on 13 July 1989.

Notes

References
 
 World War Two Nominal Roll: Sergeant Leonard Holland (57674), Department of Veterans' Affairs.
 World War Two Service Record: Sergeant Leonard Holland (57674), National Archives of Australia.

External links 

1923 births
1989 deaths
Australian rules footballers from Victoria (Australia)
Sydney Swans players